Londonderry Victoria Road railway station served Derry, County Londonderry, in Northern Ireland.

It was opened by the Donegal Railway Company on 6 August 1900. It was built in red brick in 1899–1900 by R Campbell & Son of Belfast to designs by James Barton. Its front elevation faced the Craigavon Bridge.

It closed on 1 January 1955.

The station building was purchased by O'Neill & McHenry, a firm of wholesale grocers, who adapted it for storage purposes.

The former bonded warehouse which presently has the address of 6 Victoria Road has been inhabited by Dawson Hinds Office Furniture Centre since the early 1990s.

Part of the building was leased for some years to the North West of Ireland Railway Society, which maintained a museum there.

Routes

References

Disused railway stations in County Londonderry
Railway stations opened in 1900
Railway stations closed in 1955
1900 establishments in Ireland
1955 disestablishments in Northern Ireland
Railway stations in Northern Ireland opened in the 20th century